Asia Brewery, Inc. is a Philippines-based diversified beverage company owned by LT Group, Inc., a publicly listed holding company of Lucio Tan.

History
Asia Brewery, Inc. was established by Lucio Tan on January 27, 1982, with the inauguration of its brewery in Cabuyao, Laguna and the launch of its first brand, Beer Hausen Pale Pilsen. This was followed by Max Premium beer in 1983, Manila Beer in 1985, and Beer Pale Pilsen in 1988. Beer Pale Pilsen (now, Beer Na Beer) was launched with much controversy.

By 1992, the company inaugurated its second brewery at El Salvador, Misamis Oriental with a capacity of 2 million hectoliters of beer per annum. It also began diversifying its product line with the introduction of bottled water (Summit and Absolute), iced tea drinks (Pacific Sun), sport drinks (100Plus Isotonic Drink and Cobra Energy Drink) and alcoholic mixes (Tanduay Ice and Tanduay Black “alcomixes”). The company is also looking into expanding into the international market.

International brands
The company currently brews Colt 45 (under license) and distributes Asahi Super Dry beers. It was previously a licensee brewer of Carlsberg (1987), Budweiser (1997), Lone Star (1999), Coors Original (2007) and Coors Light (2007) beers. In May 2016, the company announced it signed an agreement with Heineken International to establish a new venture (AB Heineken Philippines, Inc.) that will brew and distribute Heineken brands. The company also announced it will begin distributing Heineken and Tiger Beer.

In 2007, the company became the Philippine bottler of Virgin Cola, through its subsidiary, InterBev Philippines, Inc. until the closure of Virgin Cola.

In 2011, the company acquired Philippine distribution rights for Vitamilk soy milk from Thailand's Green Spot Company Ltd., with an option to manufacture the product under a joint-venture agreement given certain sales milestones. The following year, the company announced the establishment of AB Pascual Foods, a joint-venture with Spanish dairy company Grupo Leche Pascual (renamed as Calidad Pascual in 2014) to enter the yogurt market. The venture will initially import Creamy Delight yogurt with the intention of putting up a yogurt manufacturing facility in the Philippines in two to three years.

In March 2014, the company announced it had acquired the license to manufacture and distribute the ready-to-drink version of Nestea, taking over from Coca-Cola Bottlers Philippines, Inc. (now Coca-Cola Beverages Philippines).

Breweries
 Cabuyao, Laguna
 El Salvador, Misamis Oriental

Products

Beer:
 Beer Na Beer (Beer Pale Pilsen)
 Colt 45 malt liquor – under license
 Brew Kettle (wheat beer)
 Asahi Super Dry – distribution
 Heineken - distribution
 Tiger Beer - distribution
 Paraiso Craft Style Beer

Alcomix:
 Tanduay Ice (flavored vodka)
 Tanduay Ice Zero (flavored vodka)
 Tanduay Black (rum and cola)

Wine:
 Vivo Wine

Non-alcoholic:
 Absolute Distilled Drinking Water
 Summit Still Water
 Summit Sparkling Water 
 Summit Natural Drinking Water
 Barista's Best
 Cobra Energy Drink
 Coco Fresh
 Pacific Sun Coco Fresh Coconut Water
 Nestea (ready-to-drink) - under license
 Sunkist Carbonated Juice - under license
Dairy:
 Vitamilk Soy Milk – distribution
 Creamy Delight Yogurt
 Bifrutas - distribution (under license from Calidad Pascual)

Discontinued:
 Beer Hausen Pale Pilsen
 Max Premium Beer
 Stag Pale Pilsen
 Admiral Beer
 Q Shandy
 Colt Ice
 Pacific Sun (iced tea drink)
 Feelgood (juice drink)
 Summit Vitamin Water
 Summit Clear
 Carlsberg – under license
 Labatt's Ice - under license
 Lone Star – under license
 Budweiser – under license
 Virgin Cola In Color Red – under license
 Virgin Lemon-Lime In Color Blue - under license
 Virgin Orange Soda In Color Orange - under license
 Coors Original – under license
 Coors Light – under license
 Magnum 8.8 Alcomix
 Roots Ginger Brew sparkling non-alcoholic drink
 100Plus sports drink
 Manila Beer
 Manila Beer Light
 Ultimo Craft
 Red Oak Sangria

Basketball teams
 Cobra Energy Drink Iron Men (PBL, 2009–2010; PBA D-League, 2011)
 Stag Pale Pilseners (PBL, 1995-1996)
Manila Beer Brewmasters (PBA, 1984-1986)

References

External links
 Asia Brewery, Inc.
 Creamy Delight yogurt
 LT Group, Inc.

Breweries of the Philippines
Philippine alcoholic drinks
Companies based in Makati
Food and drink companies established in 1982
Philippine companies established in 1982